Guillermo Blest Gana (28 April 1829 – 7 November 1904) was a Chilean writer, usually considered one of his country's leading exponents of Romantic literature.

Biography
Guillermo Blest Gana was born in Santiago in 1829, the son of Chilean aristocrat María de la Luz Gana López and Anglo-Irish doctor William Cunningham Blest, one of the pioneers of the modernization of medicine in Chile in the first half of the 19th century. Carlos Orrego Luco described Guillermo as follows:

Blest Gana studied at the National Institute and accepted a professorship at the University of Chile. In 1857 he was exiled from the country for opposing the government of President Manuel Montt, and lived in various American and European countries.

He returned to Chile in 1863 and entered service as a diplomat to Ecuador, Argentina, and Brazil. In 1894 he served as mayor of Linares.

Guillermo's younger brother Alberto Blest Gana also dedicated himself to writing, and is considered the greatest Chilean novelist of the era. His work is still in print and is required reading in schools.  Guillermo's other brother Joaquín practiced literary criticism.

Writing
Gana is best remembered for his lyrical work. He also dabbed, with less success, in novels, short stories, historical dramas, and zarzuelas. He began publishing poetry at age 19 in the Journal of Santiago. In 1858 he founded the Journal of the Pacific in Valparaíso.

Selected works

Lyrical
 Poesías, 1854
 Armonías, 1884

Novel
 El número 13, 1869

Drama
 La conjuración de Almagro, 1858

Zarzuela
 El pasaporte, 1890

References

1829 births
1904 deaths
19th-century Chilean poets
20th-century Chilean poets
20th-century Chilean male writers
Chilean male poets
Chilean people of Basque descent
Chilean people of Irish descent
Instituto Nacional General José Miguel Carrera alumni
Academic staff of the University of Chile
Writers from Santiago
19th-century male writers
Guillermo